Radava is a township in the Centar municipality, part of the city Sarajevo, Federation of Bosnia and Herzegovina, Bosnia and Herzegovina.

Demographics 

According to the 2013 census, its population was 1,296.

References

Populated places in Centar, Sarajevo